Egypt and Syria, as the United Arab Republic, competed at the 1960 Summer Olympics in Rome, Italy.  Syria was a constituent of the United Arab Republic in 1960, but almost all 74 competitors for the Olympic team were from Egypt.  74 competitors, all men, took part in 34 events in 12 sports.

Avadis Nazarkoukian from Damascus (Damas) was a member of the United Arab Republic (RAU) team at the 1960 Olympics in Rome (Italy), but he did not compete. There were 80 athletes, 9 of whom did not compete.

United Arab Republic Medalists

Athletics

Boxing

Diving

Equestrian

Fencing

Six fencers represented the United Arab Republic in 1960.

Men's foil
 Ahmed El-Hamy El-Husseini
 Moustafa Soheim
 Mohamed Gamil El-Kalyoubi

Men's team foil
 Farid El-Ashmawi, Moustafa Soheim, Mohamed Gamil El-Kalyoubi, Ahmed El-Hamy El-Husseini, Sameh Abdel Rahman, Ahmed Zein El-Abidin

Football

Gymnastics

Rowing

United Arab Republic had nine male rowers participate in one out of seven rowing events in 1960.

 Men's eight
 Abdallah Gazi
 Abdel Sattar Abdel Hadj
 Mohamed Abdel Sami
 Abdel Fattah Abou-Shanab
 Taha Hassouba
 Saleh Ibrahim
 Ibrahim Abdulhalim
 Abdel Mohsen Saad
 Abbas Khamis

Shooting

Three shooters represented the United Arab Republic in 1960.

25 m pistol
 Ali El-Kashef

Trap
 Hussam El-Badrawi
 Hassan Moaffi

Water polo

Weightlifting

Wrestling

References

External links
Official Olympic Reports
International Olympic Committee results database

Nations at the 1960 Summer Olympics
1960
Olympics
Syria at the Summer Olympics by year
1960 in Syrian sport
Olympics, Summer 1960